Adela Medina  (born 3 November 1978) is an Argentine footballer who played as a defender for the Argentina women's national football team. She was part of the team at the 2003 FIFA Women's World Cup.

References

External links
 

1978 births
Living people
Argentine women's footballers
Argentina women's international footballers
Place of birth missing (living people)
2003 FIFA Women's World Cup players
Women's association football defenders